Richea dracophylla   is a species of flowering plant in the family Ericaceae. It is endemic to Tasmania.

Description

It is a tall, sparsely branched shrub which can grow to 5 metres high, but usually less. The leaves are arranged spirally around the stems and are about 22 cm long and taper to a point. Dense clusters of white flowers appear at the end of the branches in spring.

Taxonomy
The species was first formally described by botanist Robert Brown in 1810 in Prodromus Florae Novae Hollandiae, based on collections made at Mount Wellington.

Cultivation
It has been cultivated in Tasmania, with propagation by seed more successful than by cuttings.

References

dracophylla
Ericales of Australia
Flora of Tasmania
Endemic flora of Tasmania
Plants described in 1810